Anthony Moyles (born 16 November 1976) is an Irish Gaelic football coach and former player who currently manages Dunsaughlin in the Meath Senior Football Championship. Moyles originally played for local club St Pauls in the Junior Championship and was on a team successfully earning promotion to the Intermediate division. In 2002 he transferred to Blackhall Gaels with whom he won his first Meath |Senior Championship title in 2003. Between late 2008 and early 2009 Moyles moved to St Oliver Plunketts/Eoghan Ruadh, a top level team in Dublin.

Meath

Moyles has been a member of the Meath panel since 2000. He was named as the captain for 2007 which turned to a successful year for him and his panel. He played as a back for Meath in the controversial 2010 Leinster Senior Football Championship Final against Louth, which Meath won by two points giving Moyles his first Leinster title.

Managerial career
In December 2015 Moyles was appointed the Dunshaughlin manager, taking over from Kit Henry.

Honours
 1 Meath Senior Football Championship 2003
 1 Leinster Senior Football Championship 2010
 1 National Football League Division 2 2007 (C)

References

1976 births
Living people
DCU Gaelic footballers
Irish international rules football players
Meath inter-county Gaelic footballers
Blackhall Gaels Gaelic footballers
St Oliver Plunketts/Eoghan Ruadh Gaelic footballers